Presidential elections are scheduled to be held in Venezuela by 2024 to choose a president for a six-year term beginning on 10 January 2025.

Background

Crisis in Venezuela 
Since 2010, Venezuela has been suffering a socioeconomic crisis under Nicolás Maduro and briefly under his predecessor Hugo Chávez as rampant crime, hyperinflation and shortages diminish the quality of life. As a result of discontent with the government, the opposition was elected to hold the majority in the National Assembly for the first time since 1999 following the 2015 parliamentary election. After the election, the lame duck National Assembly—consisting of Bolivarian officials—filled the Supreme Tribunal of Justice, the highest court in Venezuela, with Maduro allies. The tribunal stripped three opposition lawmakers of their National Assembly seats in early 2016, citing alleged "irregularities" in their elections, thereby preventing an opposition supermajority which would have been able to challenge President Maduro.

The tribunal approved several actions by Maduro and granted him more powers in 2017. As protests mounted against Maduro, he called for a constituent assembly that would draft a new constitution to replace the 1999 Venezuela Constitution created under Chávez. Many countries considered these actions a bid by Maduro to stay in power indefinitely, and over 40 countries stated that they would not recognize the 2017 Constituent National Assembly (ANC). The Democratic Unity Roundtable—the opposition to the incumbent ruling party—boycotted the election, saying that the ANC was "a trick to keep [the incumbent ruling party] in power". Since the opposition did not participate in the election, the incumbent Great Patriotic Pole, dominated by the United Socialist Party of Venezuela, won almost all seats in the assembly by default. On 8 August 2017, the ANC declared itself to be the government branch with supreme power in Venezuela, banning the opposition-led National Assembly from performing actions that would interfere with the assembly while continuing to pass measures in "support and solidarity" with President Maduro, effectively stripping the National Assembly of all its powers.

2018 elections and presidential crisis 
In February 2018, Maduro called for presidential elections four months before the prescribed date. He was declared the winner in May 2018 after multiple major opposition parties were banned from participating, among other irregularities; many said the elections were invalid. Politicians both internally and internationally said Maduro was not legitimately elected, and considered him an ineffective dictator. In the months leading up to his 10 January 2019 inauguration, Maduro was pressured to step down by nations and bodies including the Lima Group (excluding Mexico), the United States, and the OAS; this pressure was increased after the new National Assembly of Venezuela was sworn in on 5 January 2019. Between the May 2018 presidential election and Maduro's inauguration, there were calls to establish a transitional government.

Maduro's new six-year term did not begin until 10 January 2019, when he took his official oath at a public ceremony in Caracas in front of the 
Venezuelan Supreme Court. The ceremony was attended by spectators such as Nicaraguan President Daniel Ortega and Bolivian President Evo Morales. 
The elections were widely disputed both within Venezuela and in the broader international community. In January 2019, the National Assembly declared the results of the election invalid, and invoked clauses of the 1999 Venezuelan Constitution to install National Assembly Speaker Juan Guaidó as acting president, precipitating the Venezuelan presidential crisis. Maduro's supporters refused to acknowledge the move, and Guaidó was placed under arrest for a short time.  Several international organizations and independent countries have lined up to support either side of the conflict, and the former Supreme Tribunal of Justice of Venezuela, in exile in Panama since 2017, has given its support to the legitimacy of the National Assembly's moves.

Restructuring of the National Electoral Council (CNE) 
In 2020, the Committee of Electoral Candidacies, in charge of appointing a new National Electoral Council (CNE), announced that it would suspend its meetings because of the coronavirus pandemic.

2020 transitional government proposal 
On 31 March 2020, the United States proposed a transitional government that would exclude both Maduro and Guaidó from the presidency. The deal would enforce a power-sharing scenario between the different government factions. Elections would have to be held within the year, and all foreign militaries, particularly Cuba and Russia, would have to leave the country. The US were still seeking Maduro's arrest at the time of the announcement. Other aspects of the US deal would include releasing all political prisoners and setting up a five-person council to lead the country; two members each chosen by Maduro and Guaidó would sit on the council, with the last member selected by the four. The European Union also agreed to remove sanctions if the deal went ahead. Experts have noted that the deal is similar to earlier proposals but explicitly mentions who would lead a transitional government, something which stalled previous discussions, and comes shortly after the US indicted Maduro, which might pressure him to peacefully leave power.

Guaidó accepted the proposal, while Venezuela's foreign minister, Jorge Arreaza, rejected it and declared that only parliamentary elections would take place in 2020.

Date 
Presidential elections are scheduled to be held in 2024. In November 2022, Diosdado Cabello, vice-president of the United Socialist Party of Venezuela (PSUV), insisted for two consecutive days that the elections be moved forward to the first semester of 2023, pointing out that the opposition would end up confronting each other if this were the case given that the primaries to define the candidate to represent them are planned for the same year.

Electoral system

The President of Venezuela is elected by plurality in a single round of voting.

The elections will be overseen by the National Electoral Council, with poll workers drafted via a lottery of registered voters. Polling places are equipped with multiple high-tech touch-screen DRE voting machines, one to a "mesa electoral", or voting "table". After the vote is cast, each machine prints out a paper ballot, or VVPAT, which is inspected by the voter and deposited in a ballot box belonging to the machine's table. The voting machines perform in a stand-alone fashion, disconnected from any network until the polls close. Voting session closure at each of the voting stations in a given polling center is determined either by the lack of further voters after the lines have emptied, or by the hour, at the discretion of the president of the voting table.

As part of the election administration the National Electoral Council planned a post-election audit of 54% of polling places, comparing the electronic records with the paper trail.

References

Presidential elections in Venezuela
Future elections in South America
Venezuelan presidential crisis